The , often known as "NEC Supertower, SuperTower or simply Supertower", headquarters of NEC Corporation, is a 180-metre (590 foot) tall skyscraper in Minato, Tokyo, Japan.  It was completed in 1990 and was designed by Nikken Sekkei. Its primary use is as a commercial office space. Forty-three stories high and five underground, it was constructed at a cost of some 60 billion yen, according to Nikkei Business, January 5, 2007 edition.

External links
Detail :: Portfolio Map :: PORTFOLIO :: TOP REIT, Inc., owner's website.

NEC Corporation
Skyscraper office buildings in Tokyo
1990 establishments in Japan
Buildings and structures completed in 1990